Mikhaylovka is a rural locality (a selo) in Ust-Talovsky Selsoviet, Kuryinsky District, Altai Krai, Russia. The population was 12 as of 2013. There is 1 street.

Geography 
Mikhaylovka is located 20 km southwest of Kurya (the district's administrative centre) by road. Ust-Talovka is the nearest rural locality.

References 

Rural localities in Kuryinsky District